Helen Rex Keller (August 13, 1876–January 21, 1967) was an American librarian and author of reference books. Her works included a two volume dictionary of dates.

Keller edited and wrote the preface for the Library of the World's Best Literature, a 30-volume reference work with synopses of works of literature. It was a continuation and expanded version of the Warner Library first published in 1897 with various editions up to 1917 edited by Charles Dudley Warner. She also authored a Dictionary of Dates divided into two volumes for the "old world" and "new world", and also authored the Readers's Digest of Books which provides summaries of about 1,500 books.

Keller taught classes in library economy at Columbia University and was the librarian for its journalism school.

She died in New Paltz, New York, in 1967.

Bibliography
The dictionary of dates (1934) by Helen Rex Keller, Macmillan Company, New York
Library of the World's Best Literature, editor

References

External links
 The Reader's Digest of Books (1924 edition) (archive.org)
 A Dictionary of Dates (Volume II – The New World (1923, Third Printing 1958) (archive.org)

American librarians
American women librarians
1876 births
1967 deaths
Smith College alumni
Columbia University faculty
Columbia University librarians